Jan Tomasz Gross (born 1947) is a Polish-American sociologist and historian. He is the Norman B. Tomlinson '16 and '48 Professor of War and Society, emeritus, and Professor of History, emeritus, at Princeton University.

Gross is the author of several books on Polish history, particularly Polish-Jewish relations during World War II and the Holocaust, including Neighbors: The Destruction of the Jewish Community in Jedwabne, Poland (2001); Fear: Anti-Semitism in Poland after Auschwitz (2006); and (with Irena Grudzinska Gross) Golden Harvest (2012).

Early life and education
Gross was born in Warsaw to Hanna Szumańska, a member of the Polish resistance (Armia Krajowa) in World War II, and Zygmunt Gross, who was a Polish Socialist Party member before the war broke out. His mother was Christian and his father Jewish. His mother lost her first husband, who was Jewish, after he was denounced by a neighbor. She rescued several Jews during the Holocaust, including her future husband whom she married after the war.

Gross attended local schools and studied physics at the University of Warsaw. He became one of the young dissidents known as Komandosi, and was among the university students who participated in the "March events", the Polish student and intellectual protests of 1968. Like many Polish students, he was expelled from the university, and was arrested and jailed for five months.

During the antisemitic campaign by the Polish communist government, Gross emigrated from Poland to the United States in 1969.

Career

Teaching
Gross has taught at Yale, New York University, and in Paris. He became a naturalized US citizen. He has specialized in studies of Polish history and Polish-Jewish relations in Poland. He is the Norman B. Tomlinson '16 and '48 Professor of War and Society in the History Department at Princeton University. Gross has held this seat since 2003. He is also Professor of History at Princteon, both positions emeritus.

Research
Based on documentation on Polish citizens deported to Siberia, Gross and his wife Irena Grudzińska-Gross published . In the 80s Gross wrote Revolution From Abroad: Soviet Conquest of Poland’s Western Ukraine and Western Belorussia mostly based on Hoover Archive material.

His 2001 book about the Jedwabne massacre, Neighbors: The Destruction of the Jewish Community in Jedwabne, Poland, caused controversy because it addressed the role of local Poles in the massacre. He wrote that the atrocity was committed by Poles and not by the German occupiers. Gross's book generated controversy and was the subject of vigorous debate in Poland and abroad. The political scientist Norman Finkelstein accused Gross of exploiting the Holocaust. Norman Davies described Neighbors as "deeply unfair to Poles".

A subsequent investigation conducted by the Polish Institute of National Remembrance (IPN) supported some of Gross's conclusions, but not his estimate of the number of people murdered. In addition, the IPN concluded there was more involvement by Nazi German security forces in the massacre. Polish journalist Anna Bikont began an investigation at the same time, ultimately publishing a book, My z Jedwabnego (2004), later published in French and English as The Crime and the Silence: Confronting the Massacre of Jews in Wartime Poland (French, 2011; and English, 2015).

Gross's book, Fear: Anti-Semitism in Poland after Auschwitz, which deals with anti-semitism and anti-Jewish violence in post-war Poland, was published in the United States in 2006, where it was praised by reviewers. When published in Polish in Poland in 2008, it received mixed reviews and revived a nationwide debate about anti-Semitism in Poland during and after World War II." Marek Edelman, one of the leaders of the Warsaw Ghetto Uprising, said in an interview with the daily newspaper, Gazeta Wyborcza, "Postwar violence against Jews in Poland was mostly not about anti-Semitism; murdering Jews was pure banditry."

Gross's latest book, Golden Harvest (2011), co-written with his wife, Irena Grudzińska-Gross, is about Poles enriching themselves at the expense of Jews murdered in the Holocaust. Critics in Poland have alleged that Gross dwelt too much on wartime pathologies, drawing "unfair generalizations". The Chief Rabbi of Poland, Michael Schudrich, commented: "Gross writes in a way to provoke, not to educate, and Poles don't react well to it. Because of the style, too many people reject what he has to say."

Honors
On 6 September 1996, Gross and his wife Irena Grudzińska-Gross were awarded the Order of Merit of the Republic of Poland by President Aleksander Kwaśniewski, for "outstanding achievement in scholarship".

As Professor at the Department of Politics, New York University, Gross was a beneficiary of the Fulbright Program, for research on "Social and Political History of the Polish Jewry 1944-49" at the Jewish Historical Institute, Warsaw, Poland (January 2001- April 2001).

In 1982 Jan T. Gross was awarded a fellowship in the field of sociology by the John Simon Guggenheim Memorial. Also in 1982, as an assistant professor of sociology at Yale University, he was among thirty-three Rockefeller Humanities Fellowship competition entrants awarded, his project entitled "Soviet Rule in Poland, 1939-1941."

Controversies
In an essay published in 2015 in the German newspaper Die Welt, Gross wrote that during World War II, "Poles killed more Jews than Germans". In 2016, Gross said that "Poles killed a maximum 30,000 Germans and between 100,000 and 200,000 Jews." According to historian Jacek Leociak, "the claim that Poles killed more Jews than Germans could be really right – and this is shocking news for the traditional thinking about Polish heroism during the war." Polish Foreign Ministry spokesman Marcin Wojciechowski dismissed Gross's statement as "historically untrue, harmful and insulting to Poland."

On 15 October 2015, Polish prosecutors opened a libel inquiry against Gross; they acted under a paragraph of the criminal code that "provides that any person who publicly insults the Polish nation is punishable by up to three years in prison". Polish prosecutors had previously examined Gross's books Fear (2008) and Golden Harvest (2011), but closed those cases after finding no evidence of a crime. In 2016, the Simon Wiesenthal Center said the decision to continue the investigation bore "all the hallmarks of a political witch-hunt," and a "form of alienating minorities and people who were victimized". The investigation was closed in November 2019. Prosecutors stated that "there is no conclusive data on the numbers of Germans and Jews killed as a result of actions committed by Poles during the Second World War. The establishment of such numbers is still the subject of research by historians and the subject of dispute between them." One of the experts consulted was Piotr Gontarczyk, who said there is no conclusive evidence that Poles killed more Jews than Germans during the war, but such a view is impossible to show as untrue. According to Gontarczyk, such statements, while controversial, are within the limits of academic discourse.

On 14 January 2016, because of what he described as "an attempt to destroy Poland's good name", Polish President Andrzej Duda requested a re-evaluation of the award to Gross of the Knight's Cross of the Order of Merit of the Republic of Poland. The request was met with local and international protests. Gross responded that "PiS [the Law and Justice party] is obsessed with stimulating a patriotic sense of duty. And given that most Poles do not know their own history very well, and think that Poles suffered as much as Jews during the war, the new regime is playing into a language of Catholic martyrology." Timothy Snyder, an American historian noted for his work on European genocides, said that if the order were taken from Gross, he would renounce his own.

Selected works
Books
 
 
 
 
 
  
 
 
 
 
 

Other
 "Lato 1941 w Jedwabnem. Przyczynek do badan nad udzialem spolecznosci lokalnych w eksterminacji narodu zydowskiego w latach II wojny swiatowej," in Non-provincial Europe, Krzysztof Jasiewicz ed., Warszawa/London: Rytm, ISP PAN, 1999, pp. 1097–1103.

See also
 Anti-Jewish violence in Poland, 1944–1946
 Lucy Dawidowicz
 History of Jews in Poland
 Kielce pogrom
 Research Materials: Max Planck Society Archive
 Raul Hilberg

References

Notes

Footnotes

Further reading
 John Connelly, "Poles and Jews in the Second World War: the Revisions of Jan T. Gross", Contemporary European History. Cambridge: November 2002. Vol. 11, Issue 4.

External links
 Profile at History Department, Princeton University

1947 births
Living people
American people of Polish-Jewish descent
Polish male non-fiction writers
20th-century American historians
University of Warsaw alumni
Scholars of antisemitism
Polish emigrants to the United States
Writers from Warsaw
Controversies in Poland
American sociologists
Knights of the Order of Merit of the Republic of Poland
Polish people of Jewish descent
New York University faculty